Slim Shady is the alter ego of American rapper Eminem.

Slim Shady may also refer to:

Slim Shady EP, Eminem's 1997 EP
The Slim Shady LP, Eminem's 1999 album
"The Real Slim Shady", a song from Eminem's 2000 album The Marshall Mathers LP